The Graf–Seles rivalry was a tennis rivalry between Steffi Graf and Monica Seles, who competed in 15 matches between 1989 and 1999. Seles, a left-handed player, demonstrated powerful and precise hitting from the baseline on both wings and an exceptional return of serve. Graf, in contrast, had a formidable forehand, in addition to her penetrating serve, first rate foot speed, and mostly sliced her backhand.

Their rivalry was especially notable for its change over time. Graf was dominant on tour in Seles' first years, then Seles was dominant at the Grand Slams winning three of the four matches they played between the ages of 17 and 19. During the period where Seles first reached the No. 1 spot in 1991, the head-to-head saw Graf leading 3–2, with all of their matches coming in tournament finals. In April 1993, the rivalry was temporarily halted when a fan of Graf stabbed Seles on-court, prompting her to take a hiatus after recovering. Graf won four of their five matches from 1995 onward.

List of all matches

Graf–Seles (10–5)

Breakdown of the rivalry 
Hard courts: Graf, 3–2
Clay courts: Equal, 3–3
Grass courts: Graf, 2–0
Carpet courts: Graf, 2–0
Grand Slam matches: Graf, 6–4
Grand Slam finals: Equal, 3–3
Year-End Championships matches: Graf, 1–0
Year-End Championships finals: None
Fed Cup matches: None
All finals: Graf, 6–4
All matches: Graf, 10–5

WTA rankings

Year-end ranking timeline

History 
Graf won eight of nine majors before Seles won her first. Seles surpassed Graf as the No. 1 player in March 1991, and won seven of eight grand slam titles during the period of 1991–1993. The two traded the number one ranking through the summer of 1991 before Seles consolidated her hold on the top spot. Graf in the end did recapture the No. 1 ranking from Seles in June 1993, after Seles was forced out of the sport due to her stabbing.

Notable matches 

1992 French Open final – Seles made an excellent start, Graf recovered and saved six championship points before Seles won by 10–8 in the third set, to win her third consecutive French Open Singles title. This match was voted the best women's match of the 20th Century.

1992 Wimbledon final – Graf easily defeated Seles 6–2, 6–1, in a one-sided final. The match was notable for Seles refusing to grunt after massive media criticism of her grunting in the days before, and for constant rain delays during the second set.

1993 Australian Open final – A high quality final where Seles came from a set behind to defeat Graf and win her third consecutive Australian Open Women's Singles title.

1995 US Open final – The first post-stabbing match between Seles and Graf. Graf won a close final in three sets, despite losing the second set 0–6.

1996 US Open final – Graf won 7–5, 6–4, with Graf playing at the peak of her powers. The match was more one-sided than the scoreline suggested. The end of the match and the trophy ceremony saw pouring rain.

1998 Chase Championship quarterfinal – Graf recovered from a poor start to win a close match 1–6, 6–4, 6–4.

1999 Australian Open quarterfinal – Seles won 7–5, 6–1, and finished the match strongly, for her only post-stabbing victory over Graf.

1999 French Open semifinal – Graf defeated Seles in a three-set match after coming from a set behind. This was their last ever head-to-head match. Graf went on to win the title.

See also
List of tennis rivalries
1993 Citizen Cup

References

External links
  profiles at WTA site
  Head to Head record

Tennis rivalries
Steffi Graf